Piaszczyce  is a village in the administrative district of Gmina Gomunice, within Radomsko County, Łódź Voivodeship, in central Poland. According to the Polish census of 2011 Piaszczyce has a population of 302 people

References

Piaszczyce